Honoré Charles Michel Joseph Reille (1 September 1775 – 4 March 1860) was a Marshal of France, born in Antibes.

Reille served in the early campaigns of the French Revolutionary Wars under Dumouriez and Masséna, whose daughter Victoire he married. In 1800, Reille was appointed commander of the Italian city of Florence. Promoted to general de brigade in 1803, he commanded the allied troops of Württemberg during the War of the Third Coalition in 1805. He served in the battles of Jena, Pułtusk and Ostrolenka and served as aide-de-camp to Napoléon at Friedland.

In 1808 Reille partook in the campaign in Spain, the next year he participated in the battles of Aspern and Wagram. After Wagram, he was sent back to Spain, where until 1812 he commanded in Navarre and Aragon. By 1813 he was given command of the Army of Portugal which he commanded in the Battle of Vitoria but was defeated.

After the fall of Napoléon in 1814, the Bourbons made Reille inspector-general of the 14th and 15th Infantry Divisions. During the Hundred Days, he rallied to Napoléon and was given command of II Corps, which he led in the battles of Quatre Bras and Waterloo.

In 1819 he was made a Peer, in 1847 he was made a Marshal of France and in 1852 he was made a Senator. Reille died in 1860 in Paris and was buried at Père Lachaise Cemetery, in the same tomb as his father-in-law Masséna. A street is named after him near the Parc Montsouris in the 14th arrondissement of Paris.

His son, René Reille (1835–1898), was a soldier, industrialist and politician who served for many years in the national Chamber of Deputies.

References

External links 

 
 
 
 
 

1775 births
1860 deaths
People from Antibes
Marshals of France
French military personnel of the French Revolutionary Wars
French commanders of the Napoleonic Wars
Peers of France
Burials at Père Lachaise Cemetery
Commanders of the Military Order of Max Joseph
Names inscribed under the Arc de Triomphe